Bemaneviky Ouest is a municipality in Madagascar. It belongs to the district of Ambanja, which is a part of Diana Region. According to 2018 census the population was 5,841.

Location 
Bemaneviky Ouest lies on the banks of the Sambirano River, between Manongarivo Reserve and Ankarana Reserve.

Education 
Primary and junior level secondary education are available in town. The majority 50% of the population works in fishing. 49% are farmers.  The most important crop is coffee, while other important products are seeds of catechu and pepper.  Services provide employment for 1% of the population.

References and notes 

Populated places in Diana Region